Voivodeship Road 109 (abbreviated DW 109) is a route in the Polish voivodeship roads network. The route links Mrzeżyno with the National Road 6 in Płoty.

Important settlements along the route 

Mrzeżyno
Trzebiatów
Gryfice
Smolęcin
Płoty

References 

109
West Pomeranian Voivodeship